Zapadny Kildin is the rural locality (a Posyolok) in Kolsky District of Murmansk Oblast, Russia. The village is located north of the Arctic circle, on the Kildin Island. It is located at a height of 1 m above sea level.

References

Rural localities in Murmansk Oblast